This is a list of characters in media related to Blinky Bill, an anthropomorphic koala and children's fictional character created in the 1930s by Australian author and illustrator Dorothy Wall.

Dorothy Wall characters
Blinky Bill: a young male koala
Mrs. Koala: a female koala and Blinky's mother 
Mr. Koala: a male Koala and Blinky's father, who is killed by hunters.
Angelina Wallaby: a wallaby, Blinky's nursemaid and godmother
Jacko Kookaburra: a kookaburra and Blinky's godfather
Reverend Fluffy Ears: a male koala and Mrs. Koala's cousin
Mrs. Grunty: a female koala
Snubby: a young male koala and Mrs. Grunty's son
Mr. Wombat: an old wombat
Mrs. Spotty: a frog, who runs a school for young frogs and tadpoles
Bobbin: a young female rabbit
Bunchy: a young male rabbit
Mrs. Rabbit: a female rabbit, Bobbin and Bunchy's mother
Brer Rabbit: a male rabbit, Bobbin and Bunchy's father
Madame Hare: a female hare
Mrs. Magpie: a female magpie and school mistress
Splodge: a male kangaroo
Nutsy: an orphaned young female koala
Walter Wombat: a male wombat and Mr. Wombat's son
Dr. Owl
Mrs. Field Mouse
Mrs. Porcupine
Mr. Pelican: a male pelican and the local mayor

Characters in the TV series
Blinky Bill: the lead character, a young koala. He wears red knickerbocker dungarees with a yellow button. His voice actress Robyn Moore based his voice on a naughty little boy in her classroom when she used to be a primary school teacher.
Nutsy Koala: Blinky's friend, another young koala, became Blinky's stepsister at the end of season one. She wears a lavender-purple dress and a pink scarf.
Flap: a platypus, who is one of Blinky's friends. He hates being called a duck. He wears yellow trousers. He has a speech impediment like the Looney Tunes character, Daffy Duck.
Splodge: a kangaroo who is one of Blinky's friends. He wears a green cap and green overalls with yellow suspenders. He has a speech impediment like the Disney character, Goofy.
Marcia Marsupial Mouse: a tough tomboy marsupial mouse, another of Blinky's friends. She wears pink overalls and a matching bow.
Shifty Dingo: a dingo who is the youngest in his family, who was once enemies with Blinky and his friends, but is eventually accepted after finding Nutsy's father.
Mr. Walter Wombat (nicknamed "Wombo" by Blinky and his friends): Blinky's mentor who gives him assistance when needed. He wears a dark green robe, old gloves, shoes, and green trousers with suspenders.
Mayor Pelican: the town's pompous, unhelpful mayor. He wears a purple top hat, medal, a dickie with a bow tie, and glasses.
Miss Magpie: the town's school teacher. She wears a black mortarboard hat and glasses.
Mrs. Koala: Blinky's mother. She marries Nutsy's father and becomes Nutsy's stepmother. She wears a pink dress. She is constantly bossy, strict, and responsible towards her son Blinky because of his misbehaving, except in the CGI series.
Mr. Koala: Nutsy's long-lost father. He marries Blinky's mother and becomes Blinky's stepfather. He wears a blue shirt and black pants in the 2004 TV series.
Mrs. Platypus: Flap's mother. She wears a pink dress and a white bonnet.
Mr. Platypus: Flap's father. He wears glasses (in seasons one and two), a brown shirt, and brown trousers.
Mrs. Meryl Rabbit: a Greenpatch resident and mother of many children. She wears a lilac dress and an apron.
Mr. Bobbin Rabbit: Mrs. Rabbit's husband and father of many children. He wears a yellow hat, a yellow singlet, green pants and speaks with a Yorkshire accent.
Granny Grunty Koala: an elderly koala who is hard of hearing. She wears glasses and wears old clothes like Mr. Wombat.
Danny Dingo: Blinky's antagonist (in season one), and the eldest brother in Shifty's family. Often wears sunglasses.
Meatball Dingo: Danny's younger, fatter brother, also a bully but not very bright. He wears boots and a bucket hat.
Daisy Dingo: Danny's younger sister. More concerned with her looks than anything. She wears a halter top, light-blue jeans, and blue high-heels. Her bathing suit is a green bikini.
Ma Dingo: the bad-tempered mother of Danny, Meatball, Daisy, and Shifty. She wears a yellow dress and a green headscarf.
Jacko: a kookaburra who often laughs. He wears aqua overalls and a matching hat in seasons one and two. In season three, he wears red. In the CGI film, he's made into a frilled lizard.
Nurse Angelina: a wallaby nurse at Greenpatch Hospital. She is always seen in a nurse's uniform.
Mrs. Kangaroo: Splodge's mother. She wears a light pink dress with a flower on her hat.
Mr. Kangaroo: Splodge's father. He wears a red hat, light blue shirt, dark blue pants, and brown shoes.
Mrs. Marsupial Mouse: Marcia's mother. She wears a pink dress, purple shoes, and glasses.
Mr. Marsupial Mouse: Marcia's father. He wears a white vest, red pants, and glasses.
Mrs. Spotty: a Greenpatch resident and mother of six children, who is a frog. She wears a yellow dress.
Ruff: a green frill-necked lizard who often wears a yellow shirt.  He is usually one of Blinky's recurring friends, but in one episode in season one, he mysteriously replaces Flap among Blinky's main friend circle.
Mr. Gloop: an emu who runs the local cafe. He wears an orange shirt. He and his family gulp during their dialogue.
Ms. Glennys Pimm: a human lady who runs a shop in the bush and is not particularly fond of koalas. She has a pet budgie named Cedric.
Cedric: Ms. Pimm's snooty budgie, who refers to her as "Big Nose."

New characters in Blinky Bill: The Mischievous Koala
Harry: a fat woodcutter, Joe's boss, Flo's husband, and Claire's father.
Joe: Harry's assistant.
Flo: Harry's wife and Claire's mother.
Claire: Harry and Flo's six-year-old daughter.
Gumley: Claire's toy koala.
The Frogs: TBA

New characters in The Adventures of Blinky Bill
Myrtle Koala: Blinky's shallow, materialistic classmate and Nutsy's rival. She is a koala girl who wears a red dress and a red bow.  She initially has a very obvious crush on Blinky (that heavily annoys Nutsy) until, while saving her from a fire, he accidentally gets her dress muddy.  Her shallowness and her materialistic nature drive her to get over her crush on him immediately after.
Algenon Arkwright: a little koala boy who came to Greenpatch. He plays the violin and Blinky changed his identity with him ala The Prince and the Pauper.
Inspector Longnose Fox: a fox who is a school inspector. He fired Miss Magpie for looking incompetent and replaced her with Blinky.
Mr. Possum:TBA
Wendy: a little girl who got lost in the wilderness and was found by Blinky and his gang, who later attempted to teach her to mimic their animal species.
Twiggy: A little echidna who got lost once.
Mrs. Echidna: Twiggy's mother.
Mr. Bill Koala: Blinky's biological father, seen in flashbacks. He apparently died of an illness.
Madam Wu: a panda similar to Ling Ling of the third season. She lives in a zoo and Flap once fell in love with her.
Mimi: a beige koala who lives in a zoo. She covered for Madam Wu during her temporary escape.
The King: an orangutan who lives in a zoo.

New characters in Blinky Bill's Extraordinary Excursion
Dr. Spoonbill: a yellow-billed spoonbill with a German accent and the town doctor.
Mr. Echidna:TBA
Mrs. Echidna: an echidna who is not fond of Blinky's mischievous behavior. She wears a blue headscarf and a pink dress.
Goanna: the crook at the beginning of the quest when Blinky and his friends sneaked into the cavern. He tried to stop them from escaping by doing spooky things but they escaped by mine cart.
Slick: a ring tailed possum who Blinky and his friends met when they were taken to the city. They later met him at a town with no humans. He wears a yellow shirt and talks like Eddie Murphy. This character is reused (design and voice) as Pos for Skippy: Adventures in Bushtown.
The Owl Family: Owls who Blinky met while it snowed in the wilderness they travel through.
Boris: a polar bear who came from Siberia and lives at a circus.
Mr. Penguin: a little blue penguin. Blinky met him in a Lighthouse.
The Plovers: birds who had their nest stolen.
Hank: a lizard whose parents were taken by smugglers.
Neil and Christopher: 
Cyril: a freshwater crocodile who was not like other crocodiles.  He has an underbelly that has no ridges on it and covers his chest and abdomen and goes up his neck to his jaw or mouth, cheek and nostrils.  His underbelly does not cover the bridge of his nose.  His underbelly on his jaw or mouth, cheek and nostrils are a darker color than the underbelly of his chest and abdomen.  When he is a baby, he has an underbelly that covers only his chest and abdomen and he has female eyelashes and is naked.  As an adult along with his underbelly fully developed and covering his chest, abdomen, neck, jaw or mouth, cheeks, and nostrils, he wears a pink cap and pink tank top.
Rod, Wayne and Duart: Cyril's three older brothers.  When they are babies, they have underbellies that have no ridges and cover their chests and abdomens.  When they are grown up, their underbellies with no ridges not only cover their chests and abdomens, but also go up their necks to their jaws or mouths, cheeks and nostrils, and don't cover the bridges of their noses.
Cyril, Rod, Wayne and Duart's mother and father: the mother and father of Cyril, Rod, Wayne and Duart.  The four crocodiles' mother wears a lady's hat and dress and the four crocodile's father wears an orange tank top and a pair of shorts with a belt.  They have underbellies that have no ridges and cover their chests and abdomens and go up their necks to their lower jaws and they don't cover their upper jaws of their mouths, cheeks and nostrils like Cyril, Rod, Wayne and Duart's underbellies do.
Other crocodiles: freshwater crocodiles (three of which include Cyril's older brothers) who are trained for the Iron Croc Contest.  The crocodiles in Blinky Bill have underbellies that don't have ridges on them and they cover their chests and abdomens and go up their necks to their mouths.  The baby crocodiles have underbellies that cover only their chests and abdomens like the underbellies of the dragons in Dragon Tales.
Wallace and George: two feral pigs who fooled Blinky by being a monster.
 Numbat Family: two numbats who invited Blinky to stay with them for the night.
Cockatoo: a grumpy sulphur-crested cockatoo who is not fond of Blinky after he ruined his tail and followed him around back to Greenpatch.
Amy:
Puppy:
Mr. Bower Bird: a Satin bowerbird who stole blue-colored objects from everyone else to decorate his bower and entice a girl.
Dr. Beamstock and Mrs. Universe: 
Mrs. Skewer:
Suki:
Captain Possum:
Arthur: a human who starts dating Ms. Pym. He also owns a budgie; a female named Gwendolyn.
Gwendolyn: a female budgie owned by Arthur and becomes Cedric's girlfriend.
Hotel director:

New characters in Blinky Bill’s Extraordinary Balloon Adventure

Main
Slippery: A big Weddell seal who can be a bit clumsy. Tico wanted him to go home first to Antarctica because he always gets squashed by him. He was caught on a boat with a wolf figurehead. He wears a green and purple swimsuit.
Leo: An old African lion. At the circus, he was fierce with his false teeth, but at other times shows his cowardly side. He was caught by poachers and sold to the Circus Bros. In the African Plains (where he came from), he is rejected until he proves his worthiness. He wears purple pants. He was the second to go home.
Ling-Ling: A young wise giant panda. She always remembers her master's wisdom. She is good at magic and is very helpful. She wears a light blue jacket. She was the third to go home.
Yoyo: A South Indian monkey who was born in captivity and became parentless and thus has no idea of his origin. He loves to play pranks and sometimes causes trouble. After much exploration around the world, he finally finds his family in India who are Temple Guardians of the Forbidden Temple. He wears yellow-green pants with yellow-green suspenders. He was the fourth to go home.
Penelope Poodle: A beautiful French poodle who often worries. She has many precious things. She wears a necklace and a pink Tutu, but in India, she has a red spot on her forehead, a purple skirt, and a sari. She once lived with a human in Paris who she calls a Mistress. She was accidentally sold to the Circus Bros. as a puppy. She was the last to go home. 
Circus Brothers: Two human brothers named Basil and Cyril who are the leaders of the circus with the mistreated animals. They chase Blinky around the world to catch him and his friends. They believe Blinky will be the star who'll make them rich after seeing him on the trapeze which he grabbed by accident. Basil is the ringmaster, who wears a black top hat, a black coat, a white shirt, navy-colored pants and has black hair with a ponytail and a mustache and is fat. Cyril is the clown who wears a clown face (which he is seen without after the circus was stolen), blue dungarees, a white shirt, and has ginger-colored hair. They're the main antagonists. At the end of each episode, Basil accuses Cyril for failure. In the final episode, however, Cyril reforms and assists the fire brigade in saving Greenpatch, before forcing his brother into retirement.
Tico Toucan: A grumpy miniature toucan who works for the Circus Bros. and befriends Blinky and his friends. He is often the cause of the things that happen to the balloon. He tries to help the Circus Bros. catch the animals but Blinky doesn't know about that until they reach the Amazon jungle. He originally did come from the Amazon with the other toucans, he decided to stay with the crew feeling that he didn't fit in with the other toucans despite being welcomed by them. In India he became the manager of a show performing bear, mongoose and rat.

Minor characters who Blinky met on the journey

Antarctica
Slippery's Family: A colony of Weddell seals, one of who was Slippery's mother the one wearing pink.
Skipper the Scurvy: A human who caught Slippery on a boat with a wolf-like figurehead. He went with the Circus Bros. to Antarctica to head for Slippery's family. He wears an eye patch and has a peg leg.
Penguin Colony: the family of the Baby Penguin that considered Flap to be his mother and followed him around. He took him home to his real mother Norma.

African Plains
Rex: Leo's Son, King of the Mumbada Pride. He wears light brown shorts with a belt.
Claude: Rex's Son, Leo's Grandson. He wears a blue vest.
The Poachers: Men who caught Leo and convinced the Circus Bros. to bring them a lion cub.
Chimpanzees: A group of apes who Yoyo thought was his family.
Ostrich Pride: Ostriches who had their feathers plucked by humans. Blinky was rude at them. They helped the crew get Penelope's diamond bracelet back from the Bros.
Twigger: A giraffe who Blinky met while running away from his friends after thinking that they forgot his birthday. She was caught by Poachers. She took Blinky back to his friends. She wears a light-blue bandana.
Nene and Dubaku: Giraffes who Twigger knows. Part of her herd.
Expert Game Trackers: Two humans who the Circus Bros. went with. They put them in a crate and stored them on a ship.
Elephant: an African elephant who borrowed the caravan to take her sick calf to some grass with help of the crew.
Kiku: The Elephant's sick calf.

China
Hugh: A human boy who took Flap to be his servant temporarily at the farm with his mother.
The Master: Ling-Ling's master. He was put in a cage in a human town but freed by the crew. He wears robes.
The Panda Colony: Ling-Ling's Family.
Ah-Phat: a weasel who tried to help the Bros. catch the animals. She took Tico's job. She wears a blue shirt and a hat. She was soon fired after losing the animals.
The Mountain Guardians: More Pandas who let Ling-Ling and her family share their home.

Amazon Jungle
Anna: An anaconda who is afraid of water, ever since she was young. She was in the Caravan with the crew. She saved Blinky when Basil pulled him out of the Caravan and into the water. She even saved the caravan from going over a waterfall.
Coco Phil: A howler monkey who resembles Blinky. He has two yellow buttons instead of one.
Sophia: Coco's adoptive sister who resembles Nutsy. She wears a pink dress and a yellow bandana.
Leafpatchers: South American animals who resemble the Greenpatchers. Coco has four unmentioned friends who are a sloth (similar to Flap), An anteater (similar to Splodge, but wears a blue shirt), A guinea pig (similar to Marcia) and a jaguar (similar to Shifty). Others include a jaguar family similar to the Dingo Family, an alligator similar to Ruff, an iguana similar to Mrs. Spotty, an Andean condor similar to Mr. Gloop, a peccary similar to Nurse Angelina, an Amazon turtle similar to Ms. Echidna, a Chilean flamingo similar to Mr. Gloop, and a hare similar to Mrs. Rabbit. Their names are yet to be known. 
Miss Egret: A Leafpatch resident similar to Miss Magpie.
Mr. Arnold Armadillo (nicknamed "Armo" by Coco and is friends): a Leafpatch resident similar to Mr. Wombat. He doesn't wear an old green shirt like Mr. Wombat though.
Mayor Macaw: The mayor of Leafpatch similar to Mayor Pelican. He wears a black bow tie and a big black top hat.
Macko: A Leafpatch resident similar to Jacko but is a toucan. Mayor Macaw mistook Tico for him and asked him to help out for the unveiling ceremony.
Toucans: Toucans whom Tico originally lived with. Two of them are named Pippo and Raul. Raul is usually clumsy. They were caught in cages but freed by Tico. Pippo wears a purple bandana and Raul wears a blue bandana.
Environmentalists: Two English-American humans male and female who cured Penelope from the Purple Devil. They said where Yoyo came from. They may be similar to Ms. Pym with a pet canary similar to Cedric.

India
Jugglers: A bear named Majid, a mongoose named Alsanna and a rat named Sanjay. Tico became their ringmaster and manager.
Mr. Rajid: A man who caught Yoyo and put him with the Jugglers. He steals peoples' wallets.
The Tiger: A Bengal tiger who is the mother of a tiger cub named Sondeya who was trapped under some wood. Flap freed Sondeya by digging her out.
Rami: an Indian elephant who was in the town of Chandipur. He took the Circus Bros. there. He warned Penelope about the Forbidden temple. At the end, as he, his human Gupta, and the snake charmer meet with the Circus Bros. he trumpets loudly with his trunk at the Bros and stomps after one of them.
Temple Guardians: Monkeys who are Yoyo's family. They guard the Forbidden Temple.

Paris
Mistress: A woman who Penelope lives with.
Fifi: A cat who the Mistress bought while Penelope was gone.
Maurice: A brown French Poodle who helped Penelope for her necklace. He wears a white suit. He was mean to Penelope, Blinky, Nutsy, and Flap and everyone.
Phoebe LaFoo: A lady who made Blinky a model named Monsieur B.B. It got Blinky brainwashed about his feelings of the bush. Blinky then rescued Nutsy and Flap from the Bros. and regained his memory. She is equally as selfish as Basil.
Police man: A man who arrested the Bros. for barging into the Studio.
Flight Attendant: A lady who was on the plane with Blinky, Nutsy and Flap back to Australia after the Eiffel Tower tore the balloon and their caravan smashed to the ground.

Sea (Never seen by Blinky, but they were just with the Bros.)
Sailor: A man who was with the Bros. on a sailing boat until they got on a ship.
Ship's Captain: A man who was on the ship with the Bros. until they got away by helicopter.
Captain: Another captain of a different ship who gave Cyril a time limit to bring the animals to him. The Bros. got into trouble for breaking his helicopter.

New characters in Blinky Bill's White Christmas
Angela: TBA
Chopper McGinty: TBA
Sly: Chopper's assistant.
Buttons: Sly's teddy bear.

References

Blinky Bill
Blinky Bill